The Kings School is an English-medium co-educational school in Mugalli, Goa. The school is affiliated to the Central Board of Secondary Education (CBSE). The school was a dream of founder Chairman Manuel Filipe Pereira and founder Annette Pereira. Chairman Melvin Pereira and director Ligia Pereira envisioned and executed those dreams in the garden of Child Care School, where in the year 2005, The Kings School was planted, nurtured and grew. The school has over 20 classrooms. It was initially based for grades from Nursery to X but in February 2014, the school announced that it would have a higher secondary (XI and XII).
It is the second highest earning school in Goa in terms of income, it had a total income of Rs. 9.83 crores in the financial years 2014–15 and 2015–16.

Campus

Construction 
On Children's day, 14 November 2006 the school purchased a 2.5 acre land in the scenic village of Mugalli in Sao Jose de Areal, 4 km away from Margao. In May 2007 a further 2.5 acre land was purchased and the foundation stone was laid by the founder of Child Care School, Annette Pereria on 14 June 2007 for the 3,000 m2 built up area school building for The Kings School. The building was fully completed on record time by the builders. The building was furnished and ready to start a new academic year on 5 June 2008. One of the then Lok Sabha Member of Parliament, Francisco Sardinha inaugurated the new school building at the School Sports Festival in 2009. The second phase of the school started construction in June 2008. The third phase of the school was completed in the academic year 2013–14. This phase was built for the IX-XII classes. Other than this the phase also houses the school canteen 'Pitstop', a staffroom and an indoor sports room.

Additions to the school 
In 2011, a swimming pool was gifted to the school by one of the well wishers of the school. A dedicated indoor sports area was also made where students are trained to play chess, table tennis and carom. The third phase of the school featured a canteen for more than 100 students where breakfast, snacks and lunch is served. A library was as well constructed in the first phase of the building. The school also has a turf playground where a variety of sports are played which include football, cricket and athletics.

Features of the first phase 
Library, Audio Visual Room, Computer Lab, Math Lab, Physics Lab, Biology Lab, Chemistry Lab, Learning center for students with learning disabilities, and Manuel Filipe Pereira Hall.

Features of the second phase 
Medical Hub, Art Space and Language Room.

Features of the third phase 
'Pitstop'- the school canteen and Indoor sports room

Other salient features of the school 
Bus bay cum skating rink, Open-air stage, Football ground, Multi-sport court, Swimming pool, Cricket nets, Rock climbing, Amphitheater, Green house, Volleyball court, Kids play area, Long-jump pit, Table Tennis play area, Aquarium, Mango tree sit-outs, Rain water harvesting system and the school also has a smart class system in all its classes.

Faculty 
The school has a total of 65 teaching and 21 non teaching staff. The school's Principal is Mrs. Tanuja Dessai. Mr. Wilson Varghese serves as the headmaster. In addition, the school also has separate specialized teaching staff for each co-curricular activity. The school also has expert sports coaches in addition to Leapstart sports staff and Gait dance staff.

Activities and workshops 
The school puts up many sessions and activities for the students.

The school in association with Oil and Natural Gas Corporation and Institute of Fire Safety, Health and Environmental Management Goa celebrated 'Fire Service Week'.

The school held many workshops; the latest is the robotics workshop of innovations company. The school held a Wikipedia workshop in the school where the students were explained what Wikipedia was all about and thought how to make articles and use them to the fullest.

The school annually hosts the event 'Dine & Dance' which is a fundraiser in the aid of cancer patients. In addition, the school hosts its annual 'Sports Festival' usually before the Diwali vacations which includes 100% participation by the students. They perform dances and also participate in sport events.

The school hosts various other events like cookery classes (usually every month), Van Mahotsav, Gandhi Jayanti, language festivals, etc. The school recently hosted the 'Swachhata Pakhwada'(Hindi: cleanliness fortnight) after winning the Swachh Vidyalaya Puraskar.

The school has its own clubs for its students:-
D'Artist club which hosts the 'Expression Express', Dance club which hosts the 'Dance Fiesta', Singing club which hosts 'The Voice', Robotics club, Literary club, Eco-club, Nature Buddies, Sports club, Cajetan Lobo Civic Sense Club, etc. The school hosts a 'Club Day' normally twice a year.

Achievements 
The school was awarded with the national Swacch Vidyalaya Puraskar 2017–18 for exemplary work in the field of sanitation and hygiene, the school stood 36th out of the 52 schools shortlisted. It also became the first private school from Goa to be awarded by the Ministry of Human Resource Development (MHRD).

References

External links 

 

Buildings and structures in Margao
High schools and secondary schools in Goa
2005 establishments in Goa
Educational institutions established in 2005
Education in South Goa district
Private schools in Goa